Zhao Yuping is a visually impaired Chinese Paralympic athlete competing in F12/F13-classification events.

She represented China at the 2016 Summer Paralympics in Rio de Janeiro, Brazil and she finished in 4th place in the women's javelin throw F13 event. At the 2017 World Para Athletics Championships held in London, United Kingdom, she won the gold medal in the women's javelin throw F13 event.

At the 2019 World Para Athletics Championships held in Dubai, United Arab Emirates, she won the gold medal in the women's javelin throw F13 event and she set a new world record of 46.00m. She also competed in the women's shot put F12 event where she finished in 4th place.

She represented China at the 2020 Summer Paralympics in Tokyo, Japan and she won the silver medal in the women's javelin throw F13 event.

References

External links 
 

Living people
Year of birth missing (living people)
Place of birth missing (living people)
Chinese female discus throwers
Chinese female javelin throwers
Paralympic athletes of China
Paralympic athletes with a vision impairment
Athletes (track and field) at the 2016 Summer Paralympics
Athletes (track and field) at the 2020 Summer Paralympics
Medalists at the 2020 Summer Paralympics
Paralympic silver medalists for China
Paralympic medalists in athletics (track and field)
World record holders in Paralympic athletics
World Para Athletics Championships winners
21st-century Chinese women
Chinese blind people